Giemel Abuan Magramo (born 5 October 1994) is a Filipino professional boxer, who challenged for the WBO flyweight title in 2020. As of December 2021, he is ranked as the world's sixth best active flyweight by BoxRec, and tenth by the Transnational Boxing Rankings Board

Early years
Magramo is the son of Melvin Magramo, a former Filipino professional boxer. He was introduced to boxing by his father when he was four years old and started fighting in amateur contests by age 11.

Professional boxing career
Magramo faced Michael Bravo for the vacant WBO Oriental flyweight title on 25 March 2018. He won the fight by a seventh-round stoppage, as Bravo opted to retire from the bout at the end of the round. Magramo made his first title defense against Petchchorhae Kokietgym on 29 October 2018. He made short work of his over-matched opponent, winning the fight by a third-round knockout. Magramo faced the reigning WBO International flyweight titleholder Wenfeng Ge on 5 January 2019, with both titles on the line. Ge retired from the fight at the end of the tenth round. Magramo beat Richard Claveras on 7 September 2019, in his last bout of 2019, by a third-round stoppage.

Magramo was expected to face the undefeated Junto Nakatani for the vacant WBO flyweight title on 4 April 2020. Due to restrictions imposed to combat the emerging COVID-19 pandemic, the title bout was postponed and was tentatively expected to take place in June of 2020. The fight was postponed again on 21 May 2020 for 4 July 2020, and was scheduled to take place at the Korakuen Hall in Tokyo, Japan. The fight was postponed for the third time two days later, for 1 August 2020, at the same venue and location. It was once again postponed in October, for 4 November 2020, when it finally took place. Nakatani won the fight by eight-round knockout. Magramo was staggered with a left hook, with a subsequent flurry of punches dropping him at the 2 minute mark of the round. Although he managed to rise in time for the ten count, he was unsteady on his feet which prompted the referee to wave the fight off.

Magramo returned to professional competition a year later, to face Jayr Raquinel for the vacant OPBF flyweight title in the main event of the 23 October 2021 Elorde card. He won the fight by unanimous decision, with scores of 118-110, 119-109, 115-113.

Magramo faced Jerry Tomogdan on 8 July 2022, in his first fight of the year. He won the fight by a third-round technical knockout.

Professional boxing record

References

Flyweight boxers
Filipino male boxers
Boxers from Metro Manila
1994 births
Living people
People from Parañaque